New York's 19th State Senate district is one of 63 districts in the New York State Senate. It has been represented by Democrat Roxanne Persaud since her 2015 victory in a special election to replace indicted incumbent John Sampson.

Geography
District 19 is located in southeastern Brooklyn, including some or all of the neighborhoods of Canarsie, East New York, Brownsville, Mill Basin, Sheepshead Bay, Bergen Beach, Marine Park, Flatlands, and Ocean Hill.

The district overlaps with New York's 7th, 8th, 9th, and 11th congressional districts, and with the 41st, 42nd, 45th, 54th, 55th, 58th, 59th, and 60th districts of the New York State Assembly.

Recent election results

2020

2018

2016

2015 special

2014

2012

Federal results in District 19

References

19